Dürümlü is a village in the Keban District of Elazığ Province in Turkey. Its population is 72 (2021). The village is populated by both Kurds and Turks.

References

Villages in Keban District
Kurdish settlements in Elazığ Province